Rear Admiral Jayantha Kularathna, RSP, USP, psc, MMaritimePol, MSc is a Sri Lankan naval officer who is the incumbent Chief of Staff of the Sri Lanka Navy. Prior to this, he was the Commander, Eastern Naval Area.

Early life and education 
Kularathna completed his high school from Mahanama College and then joined the Sri Lanka Navy in 1987 as an Officer Cadet of the 16th intake, in the Executive branch.

Career 
KJ Kularatne assumed office as Commander Eastern Naval Area at the Command Headquarters in Trincomalee 8 March 2022. Before that, he served as Commander of Northwestern Naval Area. Prior to his promotion to the rank of Rear Admiral on 7 August 2020, Commodore Kularathna served as Deputy Area Commander at Eastern Naval Area. From Deputy chief of staff he promoted to Chief of staff on 18 December, 2022.

References 

Sri Lankan rear admirals
Sinhalese military personnel
Living people
Year of birth missing (living people)